Chloé Bulleux (born 18 November 1991) is a French handball player who competes for club Issy Paris. She is also member of the French national team. She competed at the 2015 World Women's Handball Championship and 2016 Olympics. In February 2015 she was named the French Division 1 league Player of the Month.

References

External links 

 
 
 
 

1991 births
Living people
Sportspeople from Annecy
French female handball players
Expatriate handball players
French expatriate sportspeople in Hungary
Olympic handball players of France
Olympic medalists in handball
Olympic silver medalists for France
Medalists at the 2016 Summer Olympics
Handball players at the 2016 Summer Olympics
Siófok KC players